The Republic of Entre Ríos was a short-lived republic in South America in the early nineteenth century. On September 28, 1821, Lucio Norberto Mansilla was elected Governor of the Province of Entre Rios, and the Republic was subsequently dissolved.

In spite of the "Republic" in its title, Ramirez never really intended to declare an independent Entre Rios. Rather, he was making a political statement in opposition to the monarchist and centralist ideas that back then permeated Buenos Aires' politics.

See also
History of Argentina
List of extinct states

References

Former political divisions related to Argentina
1820 establishments in South America
1821 disestablishments in South America
Argentine Civil War
19th-century colonization of the Americas
States and territories established in 1820